The Dashengguan Yangtze River Bridge crosses the Yangtze River in Nanjing, Jiangsu.  Construction of the bridge started in 2006 and it was completed in 2010. The bridge has two main spans of  it is one of the largest arch bridges in the world. It carries six tracks: two for the Beijing–Shanghai High-Speed Railway (opened on 30 June 2011), two for the Shanghai–Wuhan–Chengdu high-speed railway (opened on 22 January 2011) and two for line S3 of the Nanjing Metro (opened on 6 December 2017).

See also
Nanjing Yangtze River Bridge Older bridge that carries the "old" Beijing–Shanghai Railway.
Beijing–Shanghai High-Speed Railway
Yangtze River bridges and tunnels
List of largest arch bridges

References

Bridges over the Yangtze River
Arch bridges in China
Bridges completed in 2010
Bridges in Jiangsu
Articles containing video clips